Huppertz is a German surname. Notable people with the surname include:

Gottfried Huppertz (1887–1937), German composer
Herbert Huppertz (1919–1944), German military pilot
Joshua Huppertz (born 1994), German cyclist

See also
 Hupperts

Surnames of German origin